Ploštín is a settlement and a borough of Liptovský Mikuláš in northern Slovakia, located 3 km south of the city center. In 2009, Ploštín had a population of 481.

Geography
Ploštín lies in Liptov Basin under Low Tatras. The cadastral territorz of the former independent municipality is spread between Roháčka, Jamy, Ploštín and Tretiny hills peaking at between 676 and 827 meters above sea level. It borders the borough of Iľanovo in the east and Demänová  borough in the west. The settlement center is located 635 meters above sea level.

Rivers
Ploštínka stream flows though the settlement in the south-west to north-east direction.

History
Ploštín is first mentioned in 1355. Archeological findings at Rohačka evidence settlements dating to late bronze age. After 1976, the city became a borough of Liptovský Mikuláš. In mid-15th century, Ploštín was considered a part of Liptovský Hrádok municipality.

Culture and services

Historical landmarks
 Lutheran prayer room with a bell tower: a single level brick building dating to early 20th century. The bell tower is square based and topped with a baroque metal decorations.

Transport
The borough is served by bus lines 3 and 4 ran by MAD Liptovský Mikuláš.

Emergency services
Despite its minimal size, Ploštín is protected by a voluntary fire brigade.

In pop culture
A punk band Ploštín Punk was established in 1992.

References

Sources
 ULIČNÝ, Ferdinand (ed.): Ploštín. Liptovský Mikuláš : Tranoscius, 2007. 213 s. ISBN 978-80-7140-273-2

External references
 Oficiálna stránka mesta Liptovský Mikuláš

Villages and municipalities in Liptovský Mikuláš District